The tribunal system of the United Kingdom is part of the national system of administrative justice with tribunals classed as non-departmental public bodies (NDPBs).

Tribunals operate formal processes to adjudicate disputes in a similar way to courts of law, but have different rules and procedures; and operate only in a specialised area. In theory, their procedures may be better suited for particular types of disputes, cheaper to administer and require less-qualified officials. In the case of appeals, however, disputes will enter the conventional court system, possibly reaching the Court of Appeal and UK Supreme Court, so the judiciary still have oversight over the tribunals. Parties are sometimes represented by lawyers at tribunals.

Examples of tribunals include employment tribunals, Office of Fair Trading adjudicators, the Gender Recognition Panel, the Planning Inspectorate and the Company Names Tribunal.

Though it has grown up on an ad hoc basis since the beginning of the twentieth century, from 2007 reforms were put in place to build a unified system with recognised judicial authority, routes of appeal and regulatory supervision. The UK tribunal system is headed by the Senior President of Tribunals.

Structure
The Tribunals, Courts and Enforcement Act 2007 created a new unified structure for tribunals and recognises legally qualified members of tribunals as members of the judiciary of the United Kingdom who are guaranteed continued judicial independence.

The Act created two new tribunals to which pre-existing jurisdictions were transferred: namely a First-tier Tribunal and an Upper Tribunal. The tribunals are divided into several "chambers", grouped around broad subject headings. All legally qualified members take the title of judge. There is a right of appeal on a question of law from the First-tier to the Upper Tribunal and some limited jurisdiction for judicial review. The Upper Tribunal is a senior court of record. There is a right of appeal to the Court of Appeal of England and Wales, Court of Appeal in Northern Ireland or Court of Session (Scotland).

The Act created the office of Senior President of Tribunals, appointed by the Queen on the recommendation of the Lord Chancellor. Lord Justice Carnwath was appointed as the first holder of the post on 12 November 2007. The Act also transferred 107 existing tribunals to the supervision of the Council. However, many tribunals still lie outside the new system.

Chambers are created flexibly by the Lord Chancellor in consultation with the Senior President of Tribunals and each has its own Chamber President. There is a Tribunals Procedure Committee to which the first transitional appointments were made on 19 May 2008.

The office of the President of Welsh Tribunals was created by the Wales Act 2017 and the first senior judicial role which relates solely to Wales.

Tribunal judgments carry a right to a warrant of execution or entry on the Register of Judgments, Orders and Fines and no longer require to be registered in the County Court or High Court.

Law governing process 

The decision making processes of tribunals can be quite heterogeneous. Though often having procedures that very much resemble those of a court of law, common law and legislative rules about court proceedings do not apply directly to tribunals. Tribunals often have their power granted to them by an act of parliament, and conventionally, in English constitutional law the judiciary cannot invalidate legislation, as the UK does not have an entrenched, written constitution. However the process of judicial reviews allow courts to challenge decisions made by tribunals. To a degree these set out some common law rules for how tribunals can make decisions.
 
Constraints include a right to a fair hearing, duty to give reasons for decision, decisions that must be rational, the right for decisions to be decided by unbiased parties

Comparison to mediation 

Tribunals are not the only court-like organizations that operate outside the court system. There are organisations offering Mediation and Alternative Dispute Resolution, often with specialised adjudicators and formal procedures. These approaches differ because involvement is voluntary for both parties, and rulings are often non-binding.

Social Security Tribunals 
The Social Security Act 1975 established a system of local tribunals to adjudicate disputes with decisions made by insurance officers. Above that a decision could be made to a Commissioner, and from there to the Court of Appeal. Appeals against decisions made by the  Attendance Allowance Board went directly to a Commissioner. Disablement questions were decided by a medical board, and an appeal could be made to a medical appeal tribunal, and from there to the Commissioners. In 1983 the national insurance local tribunals and the supplementary benefit appeal tribunals were merged by the Health And Social Services And Social Security Adjudications Act 1983.

Decisions of the commissioners were published and a loose leaf Digest of Commissioners Decisions was produced by HMSO, compiled by Desmond Neligan OBE, a retired National Insurance Commissioner.

Social security and child support tribunals were brought into a common administration system by the Tribunals, Courts and Enforcement Act 2007.

History

The earliest extant tribunal are the General Commissioners of Income Tax created in 1799.

Early twentieth century (1911–1945)
The UK tribunal system can be seen as beginning with the coming into force of the National Insurance Act 1911 which provided for adjudication of disputes by appeal to the Insurance Commissioners, and from there to the county court. During the twentieth century, UK government ministers acquired more and more power and were vested with decisions that affected the day-to-day life of citizens.

Post World War II (1945–1957)
In 1954, the government was embarrassed by the Crichel Down affair which focused public fears about maladministration and the abuse of executive authority. The magnitude and complexity of ministerial decisions had caused many such decisions gradually to be delegated to a growing number of tribunals and in 1955, the government used the debate created by Crichel Down to order a committee under Sir Oliver Franks to report on administrative tribunals and inquiries, though not ministerial decisions of the kind that Crichel Down had exposed.

The Franks Report was published in July 1957 and its principal effect was to move tribunals from an executive and administrative model towards a judicial footing. Franks identified three principles for the operation of tribunals:
Openness;
Fairness; and
Impartiality.

Council on Tribunals (1958–2007)
The report resulted in the Tribunals and Inquiries Act 1958 which established the Council on Tribunals, which started work in 1959.

The Council's principal responsibilities were to:
Keep under review the constitution and working of the [stipulated] tribunals ... and, from time to time, to report on their constitution and working;
Consider and report on matters referred to the Council under the Act with respect to tribunals other than the ordinary courts of law, whether or not [stipulated]; and
Consider and report on matters referred to the Council, or matters the Council may consider to be of special importance, with respect to administrative procedures which involve or may involve the holding of a statutory inquiry by or on behalf of a Minister.

Scotland
The Scottish ministers appointed two or three council members and three or four non-members to a Scottish Committee of which the Parliamentary Ombudsman and the Scottish Public Services Ombudsman were ex officio members.

The Scottish Committee supervised certain tribunals operating in Scotland and had the right to be consulted by the council before any report about a Scottish tribunal or, in some cases, the right to report themselves to the Scottish ministers.

Northern Ireland
The Council had no authority to deal with any matter over which the Parliament of Northern Ireland had power to make laws.

Reform (1988–2007)
Tribunals had long been criticised. Lord Scarman had seen them as a danger to the prestige of the judiciary and the authority of the ordinary law. In 1988 there were calls for an Administrative Review Council to provide independent scrutiny on the Australian model but such ideas were rejected.

Though the system was little altered by the Tribunals and Inquiries Act 1992, at the start of the twenty-first century there were further calls for reform that led to the creation of the Tribunals Service in 2006, as an executive agency to manage and administer tribunals, and to the Tribunals, Courts and Enforcement Act 2007.

See also
 List of tribunals in the United Kingdom
 Franks Report (1957)
 Federal tribunals in the United States

References

Bibliography

Franks, O. (1957) Report of the Committee on Administrative Tribunals and Enquiries, Cmnd. 218, 5s
 (Google Books)

United Kingdom administrative law